The 1958 Ottawa Rough Riders finished in 3rd place in the IRFU with a 6–8 record but lost to the Hamilton Tiger-Cats in the East Finals. This was also the Rough Riders' first season in the Canadian Football League as the league was formed in this year.

Preseason

Regular season

Standings

Schedule

Postseason

Playoffs

References

Ottawa Rough Riders seasons
1958 Canadian Football League season by team